The 2014–15 Macedonian Football Cup was the 23rd season of Macedonia's football knockout competition. Rabotnichki are the defending champions, having won their third title in the previous year.

Competition calendar

First round
Matches were played on 19, 20 and 21 August 2014.

|colspan="3" style="background-color:#97DEFF" align=center|19 August 2014

|-
|colspan="3" style="background-color:#97DEFF" align=center|20 August 2014

|-
|colspan="3" style="background-color:#97DEFF" align=center|21 August 2014

|-
|colspan="3" style="background-color:#97DEFF" align=center|N/A

|}

Second round
Entering this round are the 16 winners from the First Round. The first legs took place on 24 September and the second legs took place on 14 October 2014.

|}

Quarter-finals
Entering this round are the 8 winners from the Second Round. The first legs took place on 18 November and the second legs took place on 4 and 6 December 2014.

|}

Semi-finals
Entering this round are the 4 winners from the Quarterfinals. The first legs were played on 18 March and the second legs were played on 15 April 2015.

Summary

|}

Matches

Rabotnichki won 3–2 on aggregate.

3–3 on aggregate. Teteks won 4–2 in penalty shootout.

Final

See also
2014–15 Macedonian First Football League
2014–15 Macedonian Second Football League
2014–15 Macedonian Third Football League

References

External links
 Official Website

Macedonia
Cup
Macedonian Football Cup seasons